Y